Cuei-keer (often spelled Chuei keer) is a  boma in  Kolnyang payam, Bor South County, Jonglei State, South Sudan.  It is located about 40 kilometers southeast of Bor, and serves as the county headquarters for Bor South County.  Cuei-keer figures in a popular saying as the southernmost boma of  Greater Bor, which runs "from Cuei-keer to Cuei-thon."

Demographics
According to the Fifth Population and Housing Census of Sudan, conducted in April 2008, Cuei-keer  boma had a population of 6,804 people, composed of 3,989 male and 2,815 female residents.

Notes

References 

Populated places in Jonglei State